Sampaguita may refer to:

 Jasminum sambac, a species of jasmine also known as the Arabian jasmine. It is the national flower of the Philippines.

Music
 "Sampaguita" (also known as "La Flor de Manila"), a 19th-century musical composition by Dolores Paterno.
 Sampaguita (singer), a female rock singer from the Philippines.
 Sampaguita, a song from Limasawa Street, the debut album of a Filipino band Ben&Ben.
 Sampaguita, a single of a Filipino band juan karlos featuring Gloc-9.

Other
 Sampaguita Pictures, a now defunct Philippine film production company.